The Tour International de la Wilaya d'Oran (Tour Internationale d'Oranie) is a 2.2-categorised stage race held between 2015 and 2018 in Algeria, as part of the UCI Africa Tour.

Winners

References

Cycle races in Algeria
2015 establishments in Algeria
Recurring sporting events established in 2015
UCI Africa Tour races